William Livingston Alden (1837–1908) was a prominent American journalist, fiction writer, humorist and canoe enthusiast. He was a US diplomat in Rome from 1885 to 1890 and thereafter lived in Europe until shortly before his death.

Biography
William Livingston Alden was born in Williamstown, Massachusetts on October 9, 1837. He attended Lafayette College and transferred to Jefferson College after his father, Joseph Alden, was elected president.

He graduated from Jefferson in 1858 and read law in New York City with William M. Evarts, joining the bar in 1860.  He practiced law until 1866.  He then became a journalist, writing for the Scribner's Monthly, The Atlantic, New York World and Daily Graphic.  He later worked on the editorial staff of The New York Times and produced a weekly column called "Minor Topics".  He also wrote humor pieces and juvenile fiction. While in New York City he became an early member of the Theosophical Society, an esoteric organization founded by Helena Blavatsky in 1875.

Alden is also credited with bringing the sport of canoeing to the United States.  He founded the New York Canoe Club in 1871, which was the first canoeing organization in America.  He was a founding member of the American Canoe Association and served as its first Commodore.

Alden was appointed Consul General in Rome, Italy, by President Grover Cleveland in 1885, a position he held until 1889, and received from the king the cross of chevalier of the order of the Crown of Italy. In 1890 he lived in Paris, writing for the New York Herald until 1893, when he began living and writing in London. He died in 1908.

Works
He is the author of many works, including the following:
 Domestic Explosives (1878)
 Shooting Stars (1879)
 A New Robinson Crusoe (1880)
 Canoe and Flying Proa (1880)
 The Moral Pirates (1881)
 Life of Christopher Columbus (1882)
 The Cruise of the Ghost (1882)
 The Cruise of the Canoe Club (1883)
 The Adventures of Jimmy Brown (1885)
 The Loss of the Swansea (1889)
 Trying to Find Europe (1889)
 A Lost Love (1892)
 Told by the Colonel (1893)
 Freaks (1895)
 Van Wagener's Way (1898)
 The Mystery of Elias G. Roebuck
 His Daughter

References

Attribution

External links
 
 
 
 
 Many classic W. L. Alden short stories are read in Mister Ron's Basement Podcast, now indexed to make them easy to find
  (about half under William Livingston Alden as "from old catalog")

1908 deaths
1837 births
Washington & Jefferson College alumni
Ambassadors of the United States to Italy
People from Williamstown, Massachusetts
Lafayette College alumni
New York (state) lawyers
The Atlantic (magazine) people
New York Herald people
American expatriates in France
American expatriates in the United Kingdom
The New York Times writers
American male canoeists
New York World
American lawyers admitted to the practice of law by reading law